The 2015 Mississippi State Bulldogs football team represented Mississippi State University in the 2015 NCAA Division I FBS football season. The Bulldogs played their home games at Davis Wade Stadium in Starkville, Mississippi and competed in the Western Division of the Southeastern Conference (SEC). They were led by seventh-year head coach Dan Mullen. The Bulldogs finished the season 9–4, having won the 2015 Belk Bowl.

Previous season
The 2014 Mississippi State Bulldogs football team finished the regular season 10-2, with their only two losses to Alabama and Ole Miss. Mississippi State knocked out three top 10 teams in a row during the season, #8 LSU, #6 Texas A&M, and #2 Auburn. The Bulldogs were ranked as high at #1 in all polls including the new College Football Playoff Rankings for the first time in school history until their first loss to #4 Alabama on November 15, 2014, of a deficit of 5 points. Mississippi State was in the mix to be a part of the all-new College Football Playoffs most of the regular season until their second loss to #18 Ole Miss two weeks after the loss at #4 Alabama. The team finished the regular season ranked seven in the College Football Playoff Rankings and was invited to play in the 2014 Orange Bowl against #12 Georgia Tech of the Atlantic Coast Conference. Mississippi State fell short to the Yellow Jackets in Miami Gardens, Florida with a loss of 34-49 and finished 10-3. It was the Bulldogs' third appearance in the Orange Bowl and first since 1941.

Schedule

Schedule Source:

Rankings

Southern Miss

 Source:

Louisiana State

 Source:

Northwestern State

 Source:

Auburn

 Source:

Texas A&M

 Source:

Troy

 Source:

Louisiana Tech

 Source:

Kentucky

 Source:

Missouri

Source:

Alabama

Source:

Arkansas

Source:

Ole Miss

NC State (Belk Bowl)

Source:

References

Mississippi State
Mississippi State Bulldogs football seasons
Duke's Mayo Bowl champion seasons
Mississippi State Bulldogs football